Herbert Macdonald (9 November 1885 – 16 March 1962) was a Canadian cyclist. He competed in five events at the 1920 Summer Olympics.

References

External links
 

1885 births
1962 deaths
Canadian male cyclists
Olympic cyclists of Canada
Cyclists at the 1920 Summer Olympics
Sportspeople from Collingwood, Ontario
Sportspeople from Ontario